Maunu is either of the villages:
 Maunu, New Zealand, A suburb of Whangarei, New Zealand
 Maunu (Enontekiö), Finland
Maunu is also the Finnish form of the Swedish name Magnus.